Harvey Fetterhoff Smith  (July 24, 1871 – November 12, 1962) was a professional baseball player.  He played third base in the National League for the Washington Senators in 1896. He went to college at Bucknell University.

External links

1871 births
1962 deaths
Major League Baseball third basemen
Washington Senators (1891–1899) players
Baseball players from Pennsylvania
19th-century baseball players
Toronto Canucks players
Minor league baseball managers
People from Dauphin County, Pennsylvania